The Ay (Äy) is a river in Bashkortostan and Chelyabinsk Oblast in Russia, a left tributary of the Ufa. The Ay freezes up in late October or early November and remains icebound until mid-April. The cities of Zlatoust and Kusa are along the river Ay. Along the banks of the river, there are many steep cliff sides and caves. The current of the river has been used for hydroelectric power. It is also possible to fish for pike, bleak, and carp, to name a few species.

References

Rivers of Bashkortostan
Rivers of Chelyabinsk Oblast